Jean-André Soulié (October 6, 1858–December 11, 1905, known in Chinese sources as  [Su Lie]) was a French Roman Catholic missionary sent to East Tibet of Qing China. He was killed in a 1905 anti-Catholic revolt.

Biography 
Soulié was born in Saint-Juéry, Aveyron, on October 6, 1858. He was  ordained July 5, 1885, for the Paris Foreign Missions Society and sent in October 1885 to the Apostolic Vicariate of Thibet (now Diocese of Kangding), administered by Mgr Félix Biet. His first mission was to Batang, then at Cha-pa (now Shaba, close to Kanding). He met with his colleagues the French expedition of Gabriel Bonvalot and Prince Henri of Orléans in June 1890 at Ta-tsien lu (now Kangding). In 1896, he was sent to the mission station of Tse-ku (close to now Yanmen) with Father Jules Dubernard. This village is situated on the right bank of the Lancang (upper Mekong) river. Afterwards, he moved to Yaregong (now YariGong Xiang) where he gained some popularity by practicing medicine among local people.

Death
Soulié was captured, tortured and shot close to Yaregong, Sichuan, by lamas during the 1905 Tibetan Revolt.

Legacy

As a botanist, Father Soulié collected more than 7,000 species, among them Rosa soulieana, a species of endemic Rosa, which was introduced in Europe by Auguste Louis Maurice de Vilmorin, and studied by Museum d'histoire naturelle in Paris, and then by François Crépin in 1896. Most of Father Soulié's specimens were notably studied and defined by Adrien Franchet.

Father Soulié also sent in 1895 the first seeds of Buddleja davidii to Paris. This decorative tree was then introduced by Vilmorin and widely distributed in Europe after 1916.

Around Tsekou and Atentsé (now Yunling), he captured and sent to the French Natural History Museum the first specimens known to science of the Black snub-nosed monkey, Rhinopithecus bieti,  described by Alphonse Milne-Edwards in 1897.

See also 
 Théodore Monbeig
 Catholic Church in Sichuan
 Christianity in Tibet

Notes

References 
Françoise Fauconnet-Buzelin, Les Martyrs oubliés du Tibet. Chronique d'une rencontre manquée (1855-1940), éd. du Cerf, coll. Petit Cerf, Paris, 2012, 656 pages

1858 births
1905 deaths
French Roman Catholic missionaries
19th-century French botanists
Paris Foreign Missions Society missionaries
Roman Catholic missionaries in Tibet
Roman Catholic missionaries in Sichuan
20th-century Roman Catholic martyrs
Deaths by firearm in China
People from Aveyron
French expatriates in China
People murdered in China
French people murdered abroad
Missionary botanists
French torture victims